The following radio stations broadcast on AM frequency 1400 kHz.  1400 kHz is defined as a Class C (local) frequency in the coterminous United States and such stations on this frequency are limited to 1,000 watts. U.S. stations outside the coterminous United States (Alaska, Hawaii, Puerto Rico, & the U.S. Virgin Islands) on this frequency are defined as Class B (regional) stations.

Argentina
 LRG202 in Neuquen, Neuquen
 LRH207 in Charata, Chaco
 Radio Punto in Buenos Aires.

Canada

Mexico
 XECSAO-AM in Ciudad Serdán, Puebla
 XESH-AM in Sabinas Hidalgo, Nuevo León
 XEUBJ-AM in Oaxaca City, Oaxaca

United States

Uruguay
CX140 Radio Zorrilla in Tacuarembó, Tacuarembó.

References

Lists of radio stations by frequency